The 2016 African Volleyball Championship U19 was held in Kelibia, Tunisia from 8 to 10 September 2016. The champion qualified for the 2017 U19 World Championship.

Teams
 (Hosts)

Results

|}

|}

Final standing

Team Roster
A.Lakenji (L), A.A.Makni, G.Hmaied, M.Jenhani, S.Chaaben, N.Mhemdi, A.El Khadim (C), S.Naffeti, K.Langliz, M.S.Fehri, A.Ghariani, H.Khazri, Y.Abdelhedi, M.A.Toubib (L)
Head Coach: Yassine Sghairi

Awards
MVP:  Mohammed Salah Fehri
Best Spiker:  Muyasser Abu Rayyan
Best Blocker:  Mohammed Salah Fehri
Best Server:  Henri Marciel
Best Setter:  Atef El Khadim
Best Receiver:  Oussama Alazhari
Best Libero:  Adham Abderrahim

References

External links
Official website

African Volleyball Championship U19
Volleyball Championship U19
International volleyball competitions hosted by Tunisia
2016 in Tunisian sport
African Volleyball Championships
September 2016 sports events in Africa